Chapel Arm is a settlement in Newfoundland, Canada, located at the southeast corner of Trinity Bay, approximately  west of St. John's and two km (one and a half miles) from the Trans-Canada Highway.

With the exception of a few families, the religious denominations are Anglican and Roman Catholic. It has two churches, two parish halls, an LOL hall and a modern elementary school serving the communities of Chapel Arm, Normans cove, Bellevue and Long Harbour. It has a doctor's office, municipal building, post office, pharmacist, hardware store, and several auto garages.

The majority of people in Chapel Arm own their own homes. There is a well constructed breakwater with landing and docking facilities and a community building used for storage. There are banking facilities and a clinic located at Whitbourne about 13 km (eight miles) away.

With the ongoing construction of the Vale Canada hydro-metallurgical facility in Long Harbour, Chapel Arm has seen a sharp spike in employment and prosperity over the last several years.

Name origin 

No one is sure how Chapel Arm got its name. According to M. F. Howley, it was named for Lieutenant Edward Chappell, who sailed up Trinity Bay in 1818 (Encyclopedia of J.R. Smallwood). Historical records would suggest this claim to be incorrect. Early records of Trinity and the records of Benjamin Lester, a Poole merchant working there, mentions: "on November 10, 1767 sent sloop to Chapple for a load of birch and ships timbers that was left there".

The name of Chapel Arm goes back to 1765–1772, when James Cook and Michael Lane surveyed the coastal waters of Trinity Bay. Chapel Arm was more likely named for the spire-shaped headlands which can be seen as you enter this beautiful arm, since these headlands resemble a church or chapel roof.

The latter is the theory accepted by the majority of the population today.

Demographics 

See also 
 List of municipalities in Newfoundland and Labrador

References 

Populated coastal places in Canada
Towns in Newfoundland and Labrador